Holme Green is a hamlet in Berkshire, England, and part of the civil parish of Wokingham Without.

External links

Hamlets in Berkshire
Wokingham